Trombidium is a genus of mite with about 30 described species.

Species
 Trombidium auroraense Vercammen-Grandjean, Van Driesche & Gyrisco, 1977 – New York
 Trombidium breei Southcott, 1986 – Europe (host: Agapetes galathea, Lepidoptera)
 Trombidium brevimanum (Berlese, 1910) – Europe
 Trombidium cancelai (Robaux, 1967) – Spain
 Trombidium carpaticum (Feider, 1950) – France, Romania
 † Trombidium clavipes Koch & Berendt, 1854 – Fossil: Oligocene
 Trombidium dacicum (Feider, 1950) – Poland, Romania
 Trombidium daunium (Paoli, 1937) – Italy
 Trombidium fturum Schweizer, 1951 – Spain, Switzerland
 Trombidium fuornum Schweizer, 1951 – Poland, Switzerland, France
 Trombidium geniculatum (Feider, 1955) – Spain, Romania, Poland, Norway
  Trombidium grandissimum (Koch, 1867) - India
 Trombidium heterotrichum (Berlese, 1910) – Europe
 Trombidium holosericeum (Linnaeus, 1758) – Palaearctic
 Trombidium hungaricum Kobulej, 1957 – Hungary
 Trombidium hyperi Vercammen-Grandjean, Van Driesche & Gyrisco, 1977 – New York
 Trombidium kneissli (Krausse, 1915) – Europe
 Trombidium latum C. L. Koch, 1837 – Europe
 Trombidium mastigotarsum (Feider, 1956) – Romania
 Trombidium mediterraneum (Berlese, 1910) – Europe, Algeria
 Trombidium meyeri (Krausse, 1916) – Europe
 Trombidium monoeciportuense (André, 1928) – Czech Republic, Monaco
 Trombidium neumeyeri (Krausse, 1916) – Japan
 Trombidium parasiticus (de Geer, 1778) – Sweden
 Trombidium poriceps (Oudemans, 1904) – Europe
 Trombidium pygiacum C. L. Koch, 1837 – Germany, Romania
 Trombidium raeticum Schweizer & Bader, 1963 – Switzerland
 Trombidium rhopalicus (Vercammen-Grandjean & Popp, 1967) – Germany
 Trombidium rimosum C. L. Koch, 1837 – Europe
 Trombidium rowmundi Haitlinger, 1996 – Poland (uses spiders as host)
 Trombidium semilunare Feider, 1955 – Romania
 Trombidium southcotti Zhang & Saboori, 1996 – Iran
 Trombidium susteri (Feider, 1956) – Germany, Romania
 Trombidium teres (André, 1928) – France
 Trombidium toldti (Methlagl, 1928) – Austria

References
 Synopsis of the described Arachnida of the World: Trombidiidae

Further reading

Trombidiidae